Philochortus neumanni, known commonly as Neumann's orangetail lizard, is a species of lizard in the family Lacertidae. The species is endemic to the Arabian Peninsula in Western Asia.

Etymology
The specific name, neumanni, is in honor of German ornithologist Oscar Neumann.

Geographic range
P. neumanni is found in Saudi Arabia and Yemen.

Description
Dorsally, P. neumanni is brown or blackish with six narrow yellow stripes. Ventrally, it is white.

Reproduction
P. neumanni is oviparous.

References

Further reading
Arnold EN (1986). "A Key and Annotated Checklist to the Lizards and Amphibaenians of Arabia". Fauna of Saudi Arabia 8: 385–535.
Matschie P (1893). "Ueber einege von Herrn O N bei Aden gesammelte und beobachtete Säugethiere, Reptilien und Amphibien ". Sitzungs-Berichte der Gesellschaft Naturforschender Freunde zu Berlin 1893: 24–31. (Philochortus neumanni, new species, pp. 30–31). (in German and Latin).

Philochortus
Reptiles described in 1893
Taxa named by Paul Matschie